Matthew Mullen was a Scottish professional footballer who played as a forward.

References

Scottish footballers
Association football forwards
St Mirren F.C. players
Grimsby Town F.C. players
Dunblane F.C. players
English Football League players
Year of birth missing